Zeydan (also Romanized as Zeydān) is a village in Shoaybiyeh-ye Gharbi Rural District, Shadravan District, Shushtar County, Khuzestan Province, Iran. At the 2006 census, its population was 71, in 13 families.

References 

Populated places in Shushtar County